In Greek mythology, Despoina or Despoena was the daughter of Demeter and Poseidon and sister of Arion.

She was worshipped under the title Despoina ("the mistress") alongside her mother Demeter, one of the central figures of the Eleusinian Mysteries. Her real name could not be revealed to anyone except those initiated to her mysteries. Writing during the second century A.D., Pausanias spoke of Demeter as having two daughters; Kore being born first, before Despoina was born, with Zeus being the father of Kore and Poseidon as the father of Despoina. Pausanias made it clear that Kore is Persephone, although he did not reveal Despoina's proper name.

In the myth, Poseidon saw Demeter and desired her. To avoid him, she took her archaic form of a mare, but he took the form of a stallion and mated with her. From this union Demeter bore a daughter, Despoina, and a fabulous horse, Arion. Due to her anger at this turn of events, Demeter also was given the epithet, Erinys (raging).

Etymology
The word, Despoina ("mistress"), is possibly derived from *des-potnia, "lady or mistress of the house", from PIE *dóm(ha)os, "house(hold)" [*dem(ha)-, "build"] and *potniha-, "lady, mistress"; cf. Greek domos and potnia. The masculine form is Despotes, "master of the house"; cf. posis. In the Orthodox church the title "despoina" is given to Mary, mother of Jesus. In Byzantine Greek despoina was a feminine court title meaning "lady", while the masculine despotes meant "lord". In Modern Greek the title "despoinis" means "Miss", literally "little mistress" and can be used to address young ladies and waitresses, amongst others. Demeter is possibly a related word, interpreted by some as "mother of the house" (from PIE *dems-mater).

Cult of Despoina
The cult of Despoina was significant in the history of ancient Greek mystery religions in Lycosoura, which belonged to a stratum of an earlier religion in Arcadia.  Evidently, the religious beliefs of the first Greek-speaking people who entered the region were mixed with the beliefs of the indigenous population. The figure of a goddess of nature, birth, and death was dominant in both Minoan and Mycenean cults during the Bronze Age. Wanax was her male companion (paredros) in the Mycenean cult, and usually, this title was applied to the god Poseidon as king of the sea.

In the myth of the isolated land of Arcadia, the river spirit of the underworld appears as a horse (Poseidon Hippios), as was usual in northern European folklore. He mates with the mare, Demeter, and from the union she bears the horse, Arion (mythology), and a daughter who originally had the shape of a mare too. It seems that the Greek deities started as powers of nature, and then they were given other attributes. These powers of nature developed into a belief in nymphs and in deities with human forms and the heads or tails of animals. Some of them, such as Pan and the Silenoi, survived into the classical age. The two great Arcadian goddesses, Demeter and Despoina (later Persephone), were closely related to the springs and the animals, and especially, to the goddess Artemis (Potnia Theron: "The mistress of the animals"), who was the first nymph.
 
On a marble relief at Lycosura is the veil of Despoina, on which human figures are represented with the heads of different animals, seemingly, in a ritual dance. Some of them hold flutes. These could be a procession of women with animal masks or of hybrid creatures. Similar processions of daemons or human figures with animal masks appear on Mycenean frescoes and gold rings. Most of the temples were built near springs, and in some of them there is evidence of a fire which always was kept burning. At Lycosura, a fire burned in front of the temple of Pan, the goat god. The megaron of Eleusis is quite similar to the "megaron" of Despoina at Lycosura.

Sanctuary at Lycosura

Despoina was worshipped in a sanctuary at Lycosura, west of the town of Megalopolis. Although this cult remained regional rather than becoming panhellenic, this is a very important site for the study of ancient mystery religions. Later, Despoina was conflated with Persephone.

 
She was known by the additional epithet of Despoine among the general population, just as they surnamed Demeter's daughter by Zeus as Kore (the maiden).

Women who worshiped at the site had to adhere to a dress code that prohibited participants from wearing black or purple, possibly because those colours were worn by priestesses.

Origins
In the mysteries Demeter was a second goddess below her daughter, the unnameable "Despoina". It seems that the myths in Arcadia were connected with the first Greek-speaking people who came from the north during the Bronze Age. The two goddesses had close connections with the rivers and the springs. They were related to Poseidon, the god of the rivers and the springs, and especially to Artemis, who was the first nymph. Her epithet, "the mistress", has its analogue in Mycenean Greek inscriptions found at Pylos in southern Greece and at Knossos in Crete. Later, Despoina was conflated with Kore (Persephone), the goddess of the Eleusinian mysteries, in a life-death-rebirth cycle. Karl Kerenyi asserted that the cult was a continuation of a Minoan goddess, and that her name recalls the Minoan-Mycenaean goddess , da-pu2-ri-to-jo,po-ti-ni-ja, i.e. the unnamable "Mistress of the Labyrinth" at Knossos.

Epithet
"Despoina" was an epithet for several goddesses, especially Aphrodite, Persephone, Demeter, and Hecate. Persephone and Demeter are two of the three goddesses of the Eleusinian mysteries. They are perhaps the "Two Queens" referred to in various Linear B inscriptions. At Olympia they were called Despoinai.

The epithet, Despoina, is possibly related to the Mycenean title, "potnia" (po-ti-ni-ja), that usually referred to goddesses. Some theories suggest that this could be the translation of a similar title of Pre-Greek origin, just as the title "Our lady" in Christianity is translated in several languages. It is also theorised that the original title may have accompanied a potential Aegean mother goddess.

Archaeology
At the time of a visit to the sanctuary at Lycosura by Pausanias in the second century A.D., the sculptures would have been 300 or more years old. In the second century A.D., a statue of the emperor Hadrian was dedicated in the temple. Coins from Megalopolis, from the Severan period in the early third century, appear to depict a statue from the cult group.

There is a museum at the archaeological site called the Archaeological museum of Lykosoura, housing small finds as well as part of the cult group, while the remains of the cult statues of Despoina and Demeter are displayed at the National Archaeological Museum of Athens. The most significant artifact among its collection is the veil of Despoina, displaying a complex decorative program, probably representative of the types of embroidered woven materials created by contemporary artists. Also displayed are the heads of Artemis, Demeter, Anytos, and a Tritoness, from the throne in the sanctuary.

Legacy
 Despina, a satellite of Neptune, was named after the goddess Despoina.

Notes and references
Notes

References

See also
 Demeter
 Lycosura
 Eleusinian Mysteries
 Nepthys
 Persephone
 Potnia
 Mycenaean Gods

References
 Burkert, Walter, Greek Religion, Harvard University Press, 1985. .
Hard, Robin, Herbert Jennings Rose, The Routledge Handbook of Greek Mythology: Based on H.J. Rose's Handbook of Greek Mythology, Routledge; seventh edition, 2004, . pp. 101–102.
 Hathorn, Richmond Yancey, Crowell's handbook of classical drama, Thomas Y. Crowell Company (1967).
 Kerényi, Karl (1976), Dionysos: Archetypal image of indestructible life, trans. Ralph Manheim, Princeton University Press, 1976. .
Pausanias, Pausanias Description of Greece with an English Translation by W.H.S. Jones, Litt.D., and H.A. Ormerod, M.A., in 4 Volumes. Cambridge, Massachusetts, Harvard University Press; London, William Heinemann Ltd. 1918. Online version at the Perseus Digital Library.
Smith, William; Dictionary of Greek and Roman Biography and Mythology, London (1873). "Despoena"

External links
 Theoi Project - "Despoine"

Greek goddesses
Children of Poseidon
Epithets of Demeter
Epithets of Aphrodite
Epithets of Hecate
Children of Demeter
Epithets of Persephone
Agricultural goddesses
Arcadian mythology
Divine twins